Zawiszów may refer to the following places in Poland:
Zawiszów, Góra County in Gmina Jemielno, Góra County in Lower Silesian Voivodeship (SW Poland)
Zawiszów, Świdnica County in Gmina Świdnica, Świdnica County in Lower Silesian Voivodeship (SW Poland)